Marco Antonio Caponi (born October 9, 1983 in Godoy Cruz, Mendoza Province, Argentina) is an Argentine actor.

Biography 
Marco Antonio Caponi was born in Godoy Cruz, Mendoza Province, Argentina and there he lived the first years of his life, until he moved with his family to Maipú, Mendoza Province, Argentina. Marco Antonio Caponi at the end of high school he decided to study to be a physical education teacher, but then dropped out of the degree. Marco Antonio Caponi worked as a seller of Timeshare, a job that almost made him settle in Chile. In 2004 he decided to move to Buenos Aires, where he lived in a pension in the neighborhood of Once.

Personal life 
In 2007 Marco Antonio Caponi began a relationship with actress Carolina Barbosa and since 2009 they lived in the neighborhood of Palermo, Ciudad de Buenos Aires, Argentina. In early 2015 the prensa rosa announced that they had separated. Since 2016 Marco Antonio Caponi is in a relationship with the actress Mónica Antonópulos with whom he has a son named Valentino Caponi Antonópulos who was born in 2018.

Career 
Marco Antonio Caponi performed at a casting that Esteban Mellino was performing in Mendoza. He offered him a scholarship to travel to Buenos Aires, Argentina and become an actor. In 2006 he debuted in theater in the City of Buenos Aires, Argentina with the play Loco, posee la fórmula de la felicidad  written and directed by Esteban Mellino. In 2009 he participated in the television series Valientes. He also  made a special participation in two episodes in the television series Los exitosos Pells. In the year 2010 he was part of the cast of Alguien que me quiera issued by Canal 13. In cinema he participated in 2011 in the Marc Evans movie, Patagonia. In the year 2011 he was part of the cast of Herederos de una venganza. In the year 2012 he was part of the cast of the second season of the telecomedy Los únicos. Also after finalizing his contract with Pol-ka, Marco Antonio Caponi was part of the cast of Graduados. In the year 2013 he was part of the cast of Los Vecinos en Guerra. In the year 2014 he made a special participation in Sres. Papis. In the year 2014 he is invited to the gala n° 32 of the second season of Tu cara me suena (Season 2) where he played Joaquín Sabina. In the year 2014 he stars, replacing Walter Quiroz in the musical comedy Y un día Nico se fue with Tomás Fonzi. From January to March 2015 he stars alongside Inés Estévez and Alberto Ajaka, the work Another lifestyle by Noël Coward in the Teatro Tabarís. In November 2015 Marco Antonio Caponi is part of the work Pequeño circo casero de los hermanos Suárez by Gonzalo Demaría and directed by Luciano Cáceres in the Centro Cultural San Martín. In the year 2018 he plays Sandro de América Adult in the television series Sandro de América.

Other Work 
In 2011 it was declared "Ciudadano Ilustre de la Ciudad de Maipú, Mendoza Province, Argentina" and in 2015 he was elected as godfather of "Cine Imperial Maipú".

Filmography

Theater

Television Programs

Television

Movies

Videoclips

Awards and nominations

References

External links
 

Argentine male actors
People from Mendoza Province
1983 births
Living people